Israel Township is one of the twelve townships of Preble County, Ohio, United States.  According to the 2000 census, 1,273 people were in the township—1,031 of whom lived in the unincorporated portions of the township.

Geography
Located in the southwestern corner of the county, Israel Township borders the following townships:
Dixon Township - north
Gasper Township - northeast corner
Somers Township - east
Milford Township, Butler County - southeast corner
Oxford Township, Butler County - south
Union Township, Union County, Indiana - southwest
Center Township, Union County, Indiana - northwest

Part of the village of College Corner is located in the southwestern corner of Israel Township, and the unincorporated community of Fairhaven lies in the eastern part of the township.

Name and history
Israel Township was named for a U.S. Navy officer. It is the only Israel Township statewide.

Government
The township is governed by a three-member board of trustees, who are elected in November of odd-numbered years to a four-year term beginning on the following January 1. Two are elected in the year after the presidential election and one is elected in the year before it. There is also an elected township fiscal officer, who serves a four-year term beginning on April 1 of the year after the election, which is held in November of the year before the presidential election. Vacancies in the fiscal officership or on the board of trustees are filled by the remaining trustees.

References

External links
County website

Townships in Preble County, Ohio
Townships in Ohio